The Cambridgeshire Militia was a militia regiment in Cambridgeshire and the Isle of Ely, United Kingdom from 1759 to 1881, when it was amalgamated into The Suffolk Regiment.

History 
The Cambridgeshire Militia was formed under the Militia Act of 1757, replacing earlier less formal arrangements. From this date, better records were kept, and the men were selected by ballot to serve for longer periods. Proper uniforms and better weapons were provided, and the force was 'embodied' from time to time for training sessions. The regiment was raised in 1759.

Members were called up for training as shown in a newspaper announcement.

It was embodied in 1778, at which time it was ranked the 31st regiment of militia, and remained active for five years.
The militia were reviewed in May, 1778 by Lieut-General Sir Richard Pierson, K.B. previous to their march into Essex, where they will be encamped.

The militia also provided opportunities for socialising.

It was regularly re-ranked through its embodiment, becoming the 27th in 1779, 44th in 1780, 34th in 1781, and 25th in 1782.

On 21 April 1788 George Manby obtained a commission as a Lieutenant in this militia, where he gained the rank of captain.

Those failing to appear at the annual muster were treated as deserters, lists of those not attending were published. On this occasion nearly 100 were named.

Revolutionary Wars 

It was embodied again in 1793 for the French Revolutionary Wars, ranked as the 11th, and disembodied in 1802, having seen garrison service in Ireland.

The Cambridgeshire Militia were under orders to march from Ipswich for their own county in November 1801.

Napoleonic Wars 

With the resumption of hostilities in 1803, it was embodied as the 24th, and disembodied in 1816 following the peace at the end of the Napoleonic Wars.

None attendance at annual musters remained an issue in 1803.
 

Even those who attended muster might desert.
 

A reward of 20 shillings each was offered for the three deserters from the Cambridgeshire Old Militia at Ipswich barracks and five from the Cambridgeshire Supplementary Militia at Ely in July 1803.

In August the papers listed ten deserters.

On Friday 26 July 1803 the barracks of the garrison at Landguard Fort took fire, assisted by the Cambridgeshire Militia encamped nearby, it was extinguished in a very short time, without doing any material damage. Adjoining to the barracks was the magazine containing 300 barrels of powder, cartridges, and various kinds of combustible materials.

In September 1803 the Cambridgeshire Militia were ordered to march from Landguard Fort, and to encamp immediately with the Lancashire, at Danbury, in Essex. On their arrival then encamped on Danbury Common between the 1st and 2nd regiments Royal Lancashire militia whilst awaiting the completion of the barracks.
In late November 1805 the regiment passed through Maidstone.
In November 1805 the regiment moved into the barracks at Brabourne Lees, Kent.

The Cambridgeshire Regiment of Militia, numbering 472 in 8 companies under the command of Lt-Col Rt Hon Charles Yorke were in Lympne Camp in 1806.

Yarmouth 10 September, On Monday afternoon, about two o'clock, the City of Norwich Regiment of Volunteer Infantry, commanded by Colonel Harvey, arrived here to do permanent duty for days. They mustered 26 officers, 30 serjeants, 25 corporals, and 500 rank and file, and marched into the town good order and with a firmness of step which was not expected after so long a march. The regiment has been ordered to take all the guards here, which employs 3 officers, 8 Sergeants, 8 corporals, and 100 privates every day. Col. Yorke and the officers of the Cambridgeshire Militia paid the Norwich Regiment the compliment of immediately inviting the Field Officers and Captains to dine with them the day after their arrival.
YARMOUTH, 24 December 1807. Some French prisoners have been landed here from the Alacrity sloop of war, and were escorted to prison by a party of the Cambridgeshire militia.

In January 1808 the crews of two French luggers were landed at Hull by HMS Ariadne and escorted to prison by a detachment of the Cambridgeshire Militia.

In 1808 the regiment was based  in Yarmouth, the Barrack master was Captain George Manby formerly an officer in Cambs Militia.

In the month of March last, Capt G. W. Manby, barrack master, of Yarmouth, in consequence of information he had received that a number of forged notes were in circulation in that town, and that the suspicion of uttering them had attached to; persons belonging to the Cambridgeshire militia who were quartered there, made an immediate application to the commanding officer of the regiment on the subject, by whose order a general muster was made of the different companies, including the cooks and the baggage as well as the persons. of the men, underwent a strict search by the officers of companies in the respective mess rooms. In the course  of which the prisoner Hardy was observed by a sentry to the room where he was, and give a handkerchief tied in the shape of a handle to a woman, who went out with it. This the sentry reported to his officer, by whose order the woman delivered up a handkerchief bundle, which she swore in court to be the same that Hardy had given her to take care of; but she had not opened it, nor knew at the time what was in it. The handkerchief, however, was found to contain two £1 notes, purporting to be of the Bank of England, but proved on the oath of one of the Bank Inspectors of Notes to be both forged. Hardy in his defence said he had taken them of some smugglers, not knowing but that they were good notes. Hardy was sentenced to 14 years transportation.

In August 1808 the Cambridgeshire militia commanded by Colonel Yorke were reported to have volunteered to serve in Spain or other parts of Europe.

In May 1809 the regiment moved from Yarmouth to Chelmsford.

The Militia acted as recruiting teams both for themselves and regular units.

In May 1813 The Cambridgeshire regiment of  militia landed at Donaghadee, Ireland on the 4th, 5th, and 6th inst and marched to Belfast, their present headquarters from whence two companies were detached to Antrim, two to Downpatrick, and two to Carrickfergus.

Upwards of 400 of the Cambridgeshire Miliia now  stationed at Lifford, Derry county, Ireland, have volunteered for extending their services to Government on the present emergency, and with them 4 captains and 8 subaltern officers. This regiment has ever been one of the foremost in supplying their quota on former occasions of volunteering.

January 1816 the Cambridgeshire regiment militia has this week marched into Ely, for the purpose of being disembodied.

Littleport Riots 

Within months of this occurring riots took place.

Dubbed the Ely and Littleport riots 1816 a number of those involved were later hanged.

In 1833, it was ranked as the 68th.

Crimean War 
It saw service during the Crimean War, being embodied in 1854.
In September, 1854 Elizabeth Yorke, Countess of Hardwicke presented colours to the Cambridgeshire and Isle of Ely militia.
It was disembodied in 1856.

Recruits to the militia were not always held in the highest regard.

The Cambridgeshire, or 68th regiment of militia, was embodied on 22 August 1854 in preparation for duty in Ireland.
The PRESENTATION OF COLOURS TO THE CAMBRIDGESHIRE MILITIA by Countess Hardwicke took place at Ely Cathedral in September 1854, before the regiment moved to Ireland.

In 1881, under the Childers Reforms, the regiment was transferred into The Suffolk Regiment as the 4th Battalion.
The Haldane Reforms in 1908 converted the former Militia battalions into the Special Reserve, one per regiment. A number of duplicate battalions were disbanded; the Suffolk Regiment had two militia battalions, and so the junior - the 4th - was disbanded.

Commanding Officers 

? -1792 Lieutenant-Colonel Thomas Watson Ward

1792- ? Lieutenant-Colonel Hale Wortham

?-1808 Lieutenant-colonel Lord Viscount Royston 
1808 -? Lieutenant-colonel Tanfield Nachell

?- 1811 Colonel Yorke ;

1811 - ? Colonel Francis Pemberton (c1778-1849)

1854 Colonel Duncan

1867 Colonel the Hon Octavius Duncombe M.P

1871 Lieutenant-Colonel R.G.Wade of Cambridgeshire Militis made honorary colonel.

Legacy

Publications

References

Infantry regiments of the British Army
Military units and formations in Cambridgeshire
Military units and formations established in 1759
Military units and formations disestablished in 1881
Cambridge